Haham Bashi (translated into French as: khakham-bachi) is the Turkish name for the Chief Rabbi of the nation's Jewish community. In the time of the Ottoman Empire it was also used for the chief rabbi of a particular region of the empire, such as Syria or Iraq, though the Hakham Bashi of Constantinople was considered overall head of the Jews of the Empire.

Etymology
Hakham is Hebrew for "wise man" (or "scholar"), while başı is Turkish for "head".

The Karaites used the word "Hakham" for a rabbi, something not done in Hebrew, and the Ottoman Turks adopted this usage for this name.

History

The institution of the Hakham Bashi was established by the Ottoman Sultan Mehmet II, as part of his policy of governing his exceedingly diverse subjects according to their own laws and authorities wherever possible. Religion was considered as primordial aspect of a communities 'national' identity, so the term Ethnarch has been applied to such religious leaders, especially the (Greek Orthodox) Ecumenical Patriarch of Constantinople (i.e. in the Sultan's imperial capital, renamed Istanbul in 1930 but replaced by Ankara as republican capital in 1923). As Islam was the official religion of both court and state, the Chief Mufti in Istanbul had a much higher status, even of cabinet rank.

Because of the size and nature of the Ottoman state, containing a far greater part of the diaspora than any other, the position of Hakham Bashi has been compared to that of the Jewish Exilarch.

In the Ottoman Empire, and as such, the Hakham Bashi was the closest thing to an overall Exilarchal authority among Jewry everywhere in the Middle East in early modern times. They held broad powers to legislate, judge and enforce the laws among the Jews in the Ottoman Empire and often sat on the Sultan's divan.

The office also maintained considerable influence outside the Ottoman Empire, especially after the forced migration of numerous Jewish communities and individuals out of Spain (after the fall of Granada in 1492) and Italy.

The Chief Rabbi of the modern, secular Republic of Turkey is still known as Hahambaşı.

The term Hakham Bashi was also used for the official Government-appointed Chief Rabbi of other important cities in the Ottoman Empire, such as Damascus and Baghdad.

The position of Hakham Bashi of Palestine terminated with the appointment of separate Ashkenazi and Sephardi Chief Rabbis in 1921.

List of incumbents

Chief Rabbis of the Ottoman Empire (Hahambaşı)

Chief Rabbis of the Turkish Republic (Hahambaşı)

Chief Rabbis of Ottoman Galilee

Chief Rabbis of Ottoman Palestine

Sephardi Chief Rabbis of British Mandatory Palestine

Sephardi Chief Rabbis of Israel

See also 
 History of the Jews in Turkey
Ottoman Jews
Court Jew
Crown rabbi
Landesrabbiner
Schutzjude
Shtadlan

Notes

References
 Haim Ze'ew Hirschberg, 'Hakham Bashi', Encyclopaedia Judaica (CD-ROM Edition Version 1.0), edited by Cecil Roth (Keter Publishing House, 1997). 
 Bernard Lewis, The Jews of Islam (Princeton: Princeton University Press, 1984). 
 Stanford J Shaw, 'Appendix 1: Grand Rabbis of Istanbul and the Ottoman Empire, and Chief Rabbis of republican Turkey', in The Jews of the Ottoman Empire and the Turkish Republic (New York City: New York University Press, 1991), 272-273.

Reference notes

 
 
Orthodox rabbinic roles and titles
Turkish words and phrases
Jewish leadership roles
Titles of national or ethnic leadership